"Homegrown" is a song recorded by American country music group Zac Brown Band. It was released on January 12, 2015 and is the first single from the band's fourth studio album Jekyll + Hyde, released on April 28, 2015.  The song was written by Zac Brown, Wyatt Durrette and Niko Moon.

Content
The song produced by Zac Brown and Jay Joyce is about a man satisfied with the life he has rather than what it could be. The man sings about having everything he needs and nothing he doesn't, namely the "good friends that live down the street" and the "good lookin' woman with her arms 'round me" that he would never give up.

Reception

Critical
The single has received positive reviews from critics. Awarding the single 4 stars, Jason Lipshutz of Billboard describes the single as "an ode to simple living, but it relies on intricately arranged vocal harmonies, splendid guitar/banjo interplay and a lovely key change in the final minute." Kevin John Coyne of Country Universe gave the song a B rating. He described the song as "a perfectly fine record, one that covers very familiar lyrical territory while borrowing more from eighties middle America rock and roll than is usual for the band".

Commercial
"Homegrown" was the number one most added song at country radio in its debut week with 72 added spins, causing it to debut at number 23 on the Country Airplay chart. It was the most bought country song in the week of its release selling around 75,000 copies, more than double the number 2 selling song. It also debuted at number one on the Country Digital chart with 75,000 copies sold in its first week of release, making it the band's first number one on the chart. "Homegrown" rose to number 2 on the Billboard Hot Country Songs chart, making it the band's highest-charting single on the chart since "No Hurry" peaked at number 2 in 2012. For the week ending April 11, 2015 the song rose from number 3–1 on the Billboard Country Airplay chart, becoming the band's 11th number one on the Billboard Country Charts. As of August 2015, the song has sold 781,000 copies in the United States.

Personnel
Compiled from liner notes.

 Coy Bowles – slide guitar
 Zac Brown – lead vocals, acoustic guitar, electric guitar
 Clay Cook – background vocals, Hammond organ, electric guitar
 Chris Fryar – drums
 John Driskell Hopkins – background vocals, banjo
 Jay Joyce – programming, percussion
 Matt Mangano – bass guitar
 Jimmy De Martini – background vocals, violin, cello
 Daniel de los Reyes – percussion

Charts

Year-end charts

Certifications

References

2015 singles
Zac Brown Band songs
2015 songs
Big Machine Records singles
Song recordings produced by Jay Joyce
Songs written by Zac Brown
Songs written by Wyatt Durrette (songwriter)
Songs written by Niko Moon